Johannes Franciscus Spohler (1853 in Rotterdam – 1923) was a Dutch painter.

Biography
He was the son and pupil of Jan Jacob Spohler. He is known for landscapes and cityscapes and was the brother of Jacob Jan Coenraad Spohler. He died in Amsterdam 7 December 1923, and not in 1894 as some sources state.

References

Johannes Franciscus Spohler on Artnet

1853 births
1923 deaths
Painters from Rotterdam
19th-century Dutch painters
Dutch male painters
20th-century Dutch painters
19th-century Dutch male artists
20th-century Dutch male artists